The Battle of Cape St Mary may refer to:
Battle of Cape St Mary (1781) between the British and Dutch
Battle of Cape St Mary (1804) between the British and Spanish